Shorea exelliptica is a species of plant in the family Dipterocarpaceae. This species has previously been confused with Shorea elliptica and the species name is derived to highlight this point ( = excluded from).

S. exelliptica is found in Peninsular Malaysia and Borneo. It is found in at least two protected areas (Lambir Hills and Gunung Mulu National Parks).

See also
List of Shorea species

References

exelliptica
Trees of Peninsular Malaysia
Trees of Borneo